Bob Logan, also known as Bobby Logan, is an American film and television producer, writer and film director. His productions include Repossessed, Meatballs 4, Up Your Alley and Yard Sale.

Prior to working in feature films and television, Logan wrote comedy material for comics including: Joan Rivers, Garry Shandling, Rodney Dangerfield, Sam Kinison, and Arsenio Hall.

Besides writing and directing, he has also taught aspiring filmmakers how to make their own low-budget feature films via his "1-Day $99 Film School."  Among the school's graduates is Apple co-creator, Steve Wozniak.

Director filmography 
Life in the Bowling Lane (1985) (V)
Up Your Alley (1989)
How to Get Revenge (1989) (V)
Video Psychiatrist (1990) (V)
Repossessed (1990)
Meatballs 4 (1992)
Count DeCluez Mystery Castle (1993) (FOX PILOT)
VENT! (1998) (MTV PILOT)
Yard Sale (2004)
Grandpa Read's Quiet Time Tales (12 episodes) (2010)
Mis Videos Locos (40 episodes) (2011)
Vidiots (13 episodes) (2012)

Writer filmography 
Life in the Bowling Lane (1985) (V)
Up Your Alley (1988)
How to Get Revenge (1989) (V)
Video Psychiatrist (1990) (V)
Count DeCluez Mystery Castle (1993) (Fox PILOT)
VENT! (1998) (MTV PILOT)
Microsoft Music Video (1999) (V)
Repossessed (1990)
Meatballs 4 (1992) (Direct-to-Video)
The World's Most Daring Rescues (1998) (ABC)
Yard Sale (2004)
Grandpa Read's Quiet Time Tales (12 episodes) (2010)
Mis Videos Locos (40 episodes) (2011)
Vidiots (2012)

Producer filmography 
Life in the Bowling Lane (1985) (V)
How to Get Revenge (1989) (V)
Video Psychiatrist (1990) (V)
Count DeCluez Mystery Castle (1993) (FOX PILOT)
VENT! (1998) (MTV PILOT)
The World's Most Daring Rescues (1998) (ABC)
Yard Sale (2004)
Grandpa Read's Quiet Time Tales (12 episodes) (2010)
Mis Videos Locos (40 episodes) (2011)
Vidiots (13 episodes) (2012)

References

External links
"Logan's Television Production Company"
"1-Day Film School"
"Logan's Personal Site"

Year of birth missing (living people)
Living people
American film directors